History with Lourd is a 30-minute comedy documentary show about history lessons. It aired every Saturday at 10:00 to 10:30 PM on TV5 and AksyonTV.

Overview
Lourd de Veyra gives his own brand of history lessons and trivia in History with Lourd: Tsismis Noon, Kasaysayan Ngayon.

Host
Lourd de Veyra
Rodolfo "Jun" Sabayton

Episodes

Book
In 2018, the show's episodes were published in book format.

Awards and nominations

See also
News5
List of programs broadcast by The 5 Network
List of programs broadcast by AksyonTV

References

External links
 
 
 
 

News5 shows
Philippine documentary television series
2013 Philippine television series debuts
2016 Philippine television series endings
TV5 (Philippine TV network) original programming
AksyonTV original programming
Filipino-language television shows